Ck3 or CK3  may refer to:

Crusader Kings III, a grand strategy computer game developed by Paradox Interactive
Keratin 3, also known as cytokeratin-3